This is a list of Brazilian television related events from 1962.

Events
17 June - Brazil beat Czechoslovakia 3-1 to win the 1962 World Cup at Santiago, Chile.

Debuts

Television shows

Births
25 July - Nelson Freitas, actor, producer & comedian

Deaths

See also
1962 in Brazil